Thomas Baillairgé (20 December 1791 – 9 February 1859) was both a wood carver and architect, following the tradition of the family. He was the son of François Baillairgé and the grandson of Jean Baillairgé, both men being termed architects under the definition of the time. The family had been based in Quebec since 1741 and Thomas attended English school and then the Petit Séminaire de Québec. During the latter time, he would also have begun to learn wood carving and architecture.

By 1815, Thomas had begun his career in earnest, and from then until 1848, he designed numerous buildings; churches, houses and other projects. During this period he trained a number of students. Among his apprentices was Charles Baillairgé, his cousin's nephew. He also did wood carving and some painting. Through his work and that of people he trained, his influence carried through the first two decades of the twentieth century.

Works
Quebec Seminary, Chapel of the Congregation, 1821–24
St. Genevieve Roman Catholic Church, Gouin Boulevard West, Montreal; designed 1822; built 1843-45
Church of Sainte-Claire in 1823
Notre Dame Roman Catholic Baslica, St. Famille Chapel, 1824; new facade for the church, 1843–44; burned 1922; rebuilt
Hotel Dieu Palais street, altar for the Chapel, 1829; new facade for the chapel, 1835
Parliament House, for the National Assembly, a conversion of the existing Archbishop's Palace on the present site of Montmorency Park; with major additions, 1830–36; completed in 1852 by Pierre Gauvreau and George Browne; burned 1854
Church at Lauzon in 1830
Church of Saint-Pierre-les-Becquets (Les Becquets) in 1839
Church of Saint-Anselme in 1845
Church of St Patrick’s at Quebec in 1831 burned 1971; demol. 1974
Church of Saint-Charles-des-Grondines in 1831
Church of Sainte-Croix in 1835
Ursuline Convent, Parloir Street, addition of the Ste. Angele wing, 1836; altered 1873 by J.F. Peachy (L. Noppen et al.)
Church at Deschambault in 1833; interior 1841
Church of Sainte-Geneviève in 1836
Church of Sainte-Luce built in 1836
Church of Saint-Joachim in 1815
Church at Lauzon
Church of Saint-Antoine-de-Tilly
Church of Saint-François on the Île d’Orléans
Church at Lotbinière in 1824
Church at Charlesbourg in 1833
Church of L’Ancienne-Lorette 1837
St. Charles Roman Catholic Church, Grondines Quebec, 1838–40
St. Francois Xavier Roman Catholic Church, 1839–49; St. Francois-Du-Lac, QUE.
St. Roch Roman Catholic Convent, Church Street, 1842–44; altered 1875, 1912, 1955; demol
Bishop's Palace, Montmorency Park, 1843–44
Church at Sainte-Luce in 1845
Sisters of Charity Orphanage, St. Olivier Street, rebuilding of the orphanage, 1845
Eglise St. Roch, St. Joseph Street, 1846–50; demol. 1914
Church at Lévis in 1850
the nave of the church of Pointe-aux-Trembles (Neuville) in 1854
Séminaire de Nicolet in 1826
Convent of Saint-Roch
Collège de Sainte-Anne-de-la-Pocatière.

References

External links
 
 Biography at Biographical Dictionary of Architects in Canada 1800-1950
 Historic Places of Canada

Canadian architects
1791 births
1859 deaths